The R704 is a Regional Route in Free State, South Africa that connects Koffiefontein with Trompsburg via Fauresmith and Jagersfontein.

Route
Its north-western terminus is the R48 at Koffiefontein. The route heads south-east, and passes through the towns of Fauresmith and Jagersfontein. After Jagersfontein, it intersects with the south-western terminus of the R706. The route ends at Trompsburg, where it meets the R717.

References 

Regional Routes in the Free State (province)